Sander de Rouwe (born 1 November 1980 in Bolsward) is a Dutch politician. As a member of the Christian Democratic Appeal he was a member of the House of Representatives between 1 March 2007 and 20 May 2015. He focused on matters of traffic, transport, higher and science education, inland navigation and spatial planning.

In the provincial elections of 2015 he was elected to the States of Friesland, in which he served between 26 March and 20 May 2015. On 20 May 2015 he left the House of Representatives to become member of the provincial executive in Friesland, he was replaced by Erik Ronnes. He was invested as a Knight of the Order of Orange-Nassau on his exit from the House.

De Rouwe has been mayor of Kampen since 1 October 2021.

References 
  Parlement.com biography

External links 

  House of Representatives biography

1980 births
Living people
21st-century Dutch politicians
Christian Democratic Appeal politicians
Knights of the Order of Orange-Nassau
Mayors in Overijssel
Members of the House of Representatives (Netherlands)
Members of the Provincial Council of Friesland
Members of the Provincial-Executive of Friesland
Municipal councillors in Friesland
People from Bolsward
People from Kampen, Overijssel
Protestant Church Christians from the Netherlands